The Night They Drove Old Dixie Down: The Best of the Band Live in Concert is a 1990 compilation of live recordings from American roots rock group the Band released by CEMA Special Markets.

Reception
The editors of AllMusic Guide gave this album 2.5 out of five stars, with Stephen Thomas Erlewine noting that the performances are good and that listeners will be pleased by the music, but there is too little content and that there are "better ways to hear the Band at their peak".

Track listing
All tracks are taken from Rock of Ages. Various releases of this album have eight or 11 tracks, all of which are written by Robbie Robertson, except where noted:

"This Wheel's on Fire" (Rick Danko and Bob Dylan) – 4:07
"The Weight" – 5:32
"Rag Mama Rag" – 4:33
"The Shape I'm In" – 4:14
"Don't Do It" (Holland–Dozier–Holland) – 5:00
"The Night They Drove Old Dixie Down" – 4:34
"Across the Great Divide" – 3:59
"Life Is a Carnival" (Danko, Levon Helm, and Robertson) – 4:17
"Stage Fright" – 4:38
"The Unfaithful Servant" – 4:48
"King Harvest (Has Surely Come)" – 4:04

Personnel
The Band at the Academy of Music concerts

The Band
 Robbie Robertson – guitar, backing vocals, introduction
 Garth Hudson – organ, piano, accordion, tenor and soprano saxophone solos
 Richard Manuel – vocals, piano, organ, clavinet, drums
 Rick Danko – vocals, bass guitar, violin
 Levon Helm – vocals, drums, mandolin

Additional musicians
 Howard Johnson – tuba, euphonium, baritone saxophone
 Snooky Young – trumpet, flugelhorn
 Joe Farrell – tenor and soprano saxophones, English horn
 Earl McIntyre – trombone
 J. D. Parran – alto saxophone and E-flat clarinet
 Bob Dylan – vocals, guitar on "Down in the Flood", "When I Paint My Masterpiece", "Don't Ya Tell Henry", and "Like a Rolling Stone"

Production
 Allen Toussaint – horn arrangements
 Phil Ramone – engineer
 Mark Harman – engineer

References

External links

1990 live albums
Capitol Records live albums
The Band live albums